Aham, a concept of Kashmir Shaivism, is defined as the supreme heart , transcendent Self, supreme I awareness  or infinite consciousness. The space of Aham is where khecarī mudrā (free movement in the space of the heart) is realised. Khecarī mudrā is considered the supreme state of spiritual evolution.

Substrate of creation
When Śiva wants to create, the first step is said to be the creation of an interior space (the space of his heart) - a matrix of energies that will be the substrate of the new world. This place is called Aham which means "I" in Sanskrit. Thus the absolute first creates the divine person, Aham, and from this divine person will appear the manifestation itself.

Aham is the final resting place, dwelling place, abode of all beings, receptacle of the world.

Ultimate mantra
Another definition of Aham is that of primordial mantra, transcendental mantra, the so-called heart-bīja (mantra of the heart) - force and power of consciousness. As the supreme mantra, Aham is closely related to matravīrya (the potency of mantra). Thus the realization of Aham confers power over any mantra.

United form of Shiva and Shakti
In Aham, the supreme (para) aspect of Śakti is realized. Aham is the Śakti of Śiva or in other words, the expansion of Śiva. Another way of describing Aham is as the union of Śiva and Śakti, the emotive(visarga) aspect of the Supreme (anuttara).

Etymology
Aham is formed of A+HA+M, a triad of Śhiva (A), Śakti (HA) and bindu (M). M is the final point, union of Śiva and Śakti, where they dissolve into Paramaśiva. The triangle of A+HA+M is the essence of the Trika system.

Aham can also be defined as: A = abedha (non-differentiation), HA = bheda (differentiation) and M = bhedābheda (differentiation cum non-differentiation).

Maha, the mirror image of Aham
In Maha, Śakti (Ha) enters bindu (M) (the limited being) and reunites it with the Supreme (A).

See also
 Ramana Maharshi
 The 36 tattvas
Purusha

References

Hindu philosophical concepts
Kashmir Shaivism